The String is a 2009 French film with French and Arabic dialogue, directed by Mehdi Ben Attia and made in Belgium and Tunisia. It stars  Claudia Cardinale, Antonin Stahly and Salim Kechiouche.  Notably, much of the film was shot in Tunisia, the country of birth of the film's director, Mehdi Ben Attia as well as that of Claudia Cardinale.

Plot
The film is focused on the relationship of Malik with his mother Sara in the first weeks after Malik returns home from France to live with his recently widowed French-born mother on the family estate in the wealthy beachfront Tunis suburb, La Marsa.  There Malik (Stahly) falls in love with Sara's young handyman, Bilal (Salim Kechiouche), who lives in a servant's bungalow on the estate, and who has also returned recently from a life in France.  The French title, Le Fil, refers to Malik's neurotic anxiety, originating in childhood but continuing during the time of the story, manifest in the feeling he is attached at his back to a string that threatens to entangle and strangle him, an anxiety that expresses a troubled and deeply ambivalent relationship with his dominating mother, whom he cannot confront but upon whom he is also fearfully dependent.  The title is also apparently a play on words, as the French title of the film, "le fil" (the thread), is closely akin in spelling to "le fils" (the son).

His mother and grandmother want Malik to marry and have children, and Malik has failed to confront his mother with his own homosexuality. During the course of the story, Malik agrees to marry his friend and cousin, Syrine, a lesbian who is planning a pregnancy by artificial insemination in order to raise a child with her lesbian lover, but who nevertheless wants the child to have a father and be like other children in the traditional society of Tunisia. Malik befriends Bilal, a 25 year old also recently returned from France to Tunisia, who does odd jobs and gardening for Sara and lives in  the servants' quarters on the estate. Bilal, a sweet-natured dreamer, is distressed by the news that Malik is to marry and confronts Malik, who is devastated when Bilal tells him that he must leave, that he cannot continue as Malik's servant.  The two make love, but Sara discovers the pair in bed together the next morning, forcing Malik to decide to try to form a relationship with Bilal; Sara begins her own journey of acceptance even as the two lovers depart on a road trip to the countryside where their intimacy and bond grows.

The film opens with a class of adults studying Arabic as a second language.  While the teacher rehearses the students in repeating a simple phrase, Hakim, one of the students, whispers to his friend Bilal a question about why a person returns to his country, saying that he regrets every day his decision to come back to Tunisia from France.

Cast
 Claudia Cardinale as Sara, Malik's mother
 Antonin Stahly as Malik, Sara's son, an architect
 Salim Kechiouche as Bilal, the handyman and gardener living in the servant's bungalow on Sara's property
 Rihab Mejri as Wafa, Sara's cook and servant, lives in a room in the servants' bungalow
 Driss Ramdi as Hakim, Bilal's friend, a fellow student learning Arabic as a second language
 Ramla Ayari as Syrine, Malik's cousin, friend and colleague at an architectural firm
 Abir Bennani as Leïla, the girlfriend of Syrine
 Lotfi Dziri as Abdelaziz, the father of Malik, recently deceased at the time the main story takes place, he's seen in flashbacks of Malik's and Sara's memories.
 Nejia Nemzi as Malik's paternal grandmother
 Ali Mrabet as Wassim, the homosexual cousin of Malik
 Hosni Khaled as Moncef, Syrine's father and a friend of Malik's parents

References

External links
 
 TLAReleasing official page

2009 films
French LGBT-related films
2000s Arabic-language films
2000s French-language films
Films shot in Tunisia
Tunisian LGBT-related films
Gay-related films
2009 LGBT-related films
LGBT-related drama films
French drama films
Tunisian drama films
2009 multilingual films
French multilingual films
2000s French films